Vasl or VASL may refer to:

Vasl (television series), 2010 Pakistani drama serial
Miha Vašl (born 1992), Slovenian basketball player
Virtual Advanced Squad Leader, computerized interface for playing board game Advanced Squad Leader
Solapur Airport, ICAO code VASL, airport in Solapur, Maharashtra, India